Toni Bizaca (born 3 December 1982) is a Croatian retired basketball player. Bizaca is a 6 ft 8 in forward and has played for multiple teams in Bosnia and Herzegovina, Croatia, Ukraine and Sweden in his career. In Sweden, he won five Basketligan championships and was named the league's Most Valuable Player twice.

Career statistics

Domestic

|-
|style="text-align:left;"|2011-12
|style="text-align:left;"|Dubrovnik
|A-1 Liga||9||||35.4||.611||.474||.818||6.9||1.6||.9||1.3||23.7
|-
|style="text-align:left;background:#afe6ba;"|2012-13†
|style="text-align:left;" rowspan=4|Södertälje
|rowspan=4|Basketligan||41||||25.2||.485||.367||.821||4.3||1.3||.8||.4||15.6
|-
|style="text-align:left;background:#afe6ba;"|2013-14†
||52||||27.5||.487||.454||.814||4.3||1.7||.7||.7||17.2
|-
|style="text-align:left;background:#afe6ba;"|2014-15†
||47||||28.5||.454||.387||.831||4.5||1.7||.7||.4||16.7
|-
|style="text-align:left;background:#afe6ba;"|2015-16†
||40||||27.2||.500||.395||.832||4.5||1.5||1.1||.5||16.8

Honours
Södertälje Kings
Basketligan (5): 2013, 2014, 2015, 2016, 2019
Individual awards
Basketligan MVP (2): 2013, 2014
Basketligan Finals MVP: 2014
A-1 Liga All-Star: 2010

External links
Eurobasket.com profile
RealGM.com profile
EuroChallenge profile

1982 births
Living people
BC Khimik players
Croatian men's basketball players
KK Split players
Power forwards (basketball)
Small forwards
Södertälje Kings players
Basketball players from Split, Croatia